Kjell Elgjo (1930 – 9 December 2011) was a Norwegian pathologist.

He took the Candidate of Medicine degree at the University of Oslo in 1956 and the Doctor Medicinae degree in 1966. He was a prosector at the University of Oslo from 1965, docent from 1969 and professor from 1978 to his retirement in 1996. Since 1985 he was a fellow of the Norwegian Academy of Science and Letters.

References

1930 births
2011 deaths
University of Oslo alumni
Academic staff of the University of Oslo
Norwegian pathologists
Members of the Norwegian Academy of Science and Letters